"Get Ready" is a Motown song written by Smokey Robinson, which resulted in two hit records for the label: a U.S. No. 29 version by The Temptations in 1966, and a U.S. No. 4 version by Rare Earth in 1970. It is significant for being the last song Robinson wrote and produced for the Temptations, due to a deal Berry Gordy made with Norman Whitfield, that if "Get Ready" did not meet with the expected degree of success, then Whitfield's song, "Ain't Too Proud to Beg", would get the next release, which resulted in Whitfield more or less replacing Robinson as the group's producer.

The Temptations version 
The original Temptations version of "Get Ready", produced by Smokey Robinson, was designed as an answer to the latest dance craze, "The Duck". The Temptations' falsetto Eddie Kendricks sings lead on the song, which Robinson produced as an up-tempo dance number with a prominent rhythm provided by Motown drummer Benny Benjamin. The song made it to No. 1 on the U.S. R&B singles chart, while peaking at No. 29 on the pop charts.

The B-side to "Get Ready" was the ballad "Fading Away", which was also led by Kendricks. Written by Miracles members Smokey Robinson, Pete Moore, and Bobby Rogers, and produced by Robinson, "Fading Away" was later included on the Temptations 1966 album Gettin' Ready along with the hit side.

The group's previous singles since "My Girl" had all landed in the U.S. Pop charts (and R&B charts) Top 20. However, although it hit No. 1 on the R&B charts (their first since "My Girl"),  "Get Ready" was only a Top 30 hit (missing the Top 20 by nine positions), while "Fading Away" missed all U.S. national charts. As was promised, the next single released would have Norman Whitfield's song on it. When Whitfield's "Ain't Too Proud to Beg" (also a No. 1 R&B hit) made it to thirteen on the pop charts, Motown chief Berry Gordy assigned him to be the Temptations' new main producer. Ironically, the song did eventually become a Top 10 pop hit, but not by the Temptations, but by the Motown rock band Rare Earth. (The Temptations' version eventually reached No. 10 in the UK in 1969).

Until the group recorded "Please Return Your Love to Me" in 1968, this was their last song to feature lead vocals solely by Kendricks, as David Ruffin (who was with the group at the time), and later, Dennis Edwards, would be placed in that role in later songs.

The Temptations re-recorded the song as part of a series of promos for American television network CBS during the 1990-91 TV season. At the time, the network had been using the "Get Ready for CBS" tagline since 1988, and the song's lyrics were modified to incorporate said tagline.

Charts

Certifications

Rare Earth version 

In 1970, Motown's rock band Rare Earth released a cover version of the song as a single. Rare Earth's "Get Ready" was the band's first recording for Motown, and was based upon a version they performed as part of the closing numbers to their live performances.

Their 45 RPM single sold in excess of a million U.S. copies, earning a gold certification from the RIAA. In the live show, each member of the band performed a solo, resulting in a twenty-one-minute rendition of the song. It has been debated whether the actual recording for the album was really recorded at a concert. It has been noted that the audience sounds throughout the song are repetitive and canned. This had been done before with the Kingsmen's version of "Louie Louie" released on an album with party crowd noise dubbed in.

The band wanted to release "Get Ready" as a single, but Motown declined at first, issuing the unsuccessful "Generation, Light Up the Sky" as the band's first single. Finally deferring to the band's wishes in February 1970, Motown released a three-minute edit of the song as a single, which became a hit. "Get Ready" hit No. 2 on the Cash Box Top 100 and peaked at #4 on the Billboard Hot 100.  It took up the entire second side of their platinum-selling Motown album, also titled Get Ready.  The Rare Earth version of the song also peaked at number twenty on the R&B chart. Today, "Get Ready" is among the most familiar of both the Temptations' and Rare Earth's recordings.

The B-side of the single of "Get Ready" is "Magic Key", which is found on the same album as "Get Ready". "Magic Key" has a fast tempo, and uses a mixolydian chord progression with a key change on the chorus.

Charts

Weekly charts

Year-end charts

Certifications

Other cover versions 
 The song was Ella Fitzgerald's last US chart record (1969), reaching the Billboard Bubbling Under the Hot 100 survey (#126) and the Record World "Non-Rock Top 40". She performed it on The Carol Burnett Show in November 1969.
 Australian singer Carol Hitchcock released a version which was produced by Stock, Aitken and Waterman in 1987 that became a moderate hit in her homeland, peaking at No. 18, but only achieved minor UK success, peaking at No. 56.
 The song was recorded by its original author Smokey Robinson, for his 1979 album Where There's Smoke…. This 6-minute disco version was also released as a single and made #82 on the R&B Charts.

References

1966 songs
1966 singles
1970 singles
The Temptations songs
Rare Earth (band) songs
RPM Top Singles number-one singles
Songs written by Smokey Robinson
Motown singles
Gordy Records singles
Song recordings produced by Smokey Robinson